The Journal of Intensive Care Medicine is a bimonthly peer-reviewed medical journal covering research in the field of intensive-care medicine. The editors-in-chief are James M. Rippe and Nicholas Smyrnios (University of Massachusetts Medical School). It was established in 1986 and is currently published by SAGE Publications.

Abstracting and indexing 
The Journal of Intensive Care Medicine is abstracted and indexed in:
 CINAHL
 EMBASE
 InfoTrac
 MEDLINE
 Scopus

External links 
 

SAGE Publishing academic journals
English-language journals
Emergency medicine journals
Bimonthly journals
Publications established in 1986